Mostafa Arab (born August 13, 1941) is a retired Iranian association football defender. After Hossein Kaebi, Arab is the second youngest Iran national football team player of all time, debuting at the age of 16. He played three games at the 1964 Summer Olympics in Tokyo, won a silver medal at the 1966 Asian Games, and held the 1968 and 1972 AFC Asian Cups.

Education
Arab is married and has five children. He holds six different master's degrees from colleges and universities in Iran and U.S. He also has a Ph.D. in philosophy, leadership and human behavior. Arab teaches at a private academy and runs a publication company in Southern California ("Pajouhesh" monthly and "Arya" newsletter).

Achievements
 Selected All Star team in the Continental of Asia twice (1966–1968)
 Athlete of the Year 3 times in [[Iran]]
 Bronze medalist at the World Armed Forces Championship in 1968, Athens, Greece
 Silver medalist of the Asian games in 1966, Bangkok, Thailand
 Gold medalist of the Asian Nations Cup 1972, Bangkok, Thailand
 Gold medalist of the Asian Nations Cup 1968, Tehran, Iran
 Captain/Player of Iranian national team in pre Olympic Games in 1972, Germany
 Captain/Player of Iranian national team in Olympic Games in 1964, Tokyo, Japan
 Captain/Player in the Iranian Imperial Air Force team for 18 years
 Captain/Player and Iranian Armed Forces for 16 years

References

External links 
 
 

1941 births
Olympic footballers of Iran
Footballers at the 1964 Summer Olympics
Iran international footballers
Iranian footballers
Living people
Asian Games silver medalists for Iran
Asian Games medalists in football
1968 AFC Asian Cup players
1972 AFC Asian Cup players
Footballers at the 1966 Asian Games
Footballers at the 1970 Asian Games
Association football defenders
Medalists at the 1966 Asian Games